The 1944 United States House of Representatives elections in Virginia were held on November 7, 1944 to determine who will represent the Commonwealth of Virginia in the United States House of Representatives. Virginia had nine seats in the House, apportioned according to the 1940 United States Census. Representatives are elected for two-year terms.

Overview

References

See also
 United States House elections, 1944

Virginia
1944
1944 Virginia elections